George Underwood (born 5 February 1947) is a British artist and musician. He is best known for designing album covers for numerous bands in the 1970s and his collaborations with long-term friend, singer-songwriter David Bowie.

Early life and career 
George Underwood attended Bromley Technical High School where he developed an interest in music alongside classmates David Bowie and Peter Frampton. Underwood's and Bowie's band, George and the Dragons was short-lived due to Underwood punching Bowie in the left eye while wearing a ring on his finger, during a fight over a girl, causing paralysis in Bowie's left pupil and his distinctive mismatched appearance. The injury did not affect their friendship in the end, and Underwood went on to record one album with Bowie (in their band The King Bees) and also a solo record under the name Calvin James.

After deciding that the music business was not for him, Underwood returned to art studies and worked in design studios as an illustrator. Initially, he specialized in fantasy, horror and science fiction book covers, but as many of his colleagues were in the music business, they began asking him to do various art works for them. This led to him becoming a freelance artist. Underwood established himself as a leading art illustrator doing album covers for such artists as T. Rex (Futuristic Dragon, My People Were Fair and Had Sky in Their Hair... But Now They're Content to Wear Stars on Their Brows), The Fixx (Phantoms, Reach the Beach, Beautiful Friction and Calm Animals), Procol Harum (Shine On Brightly), Mott the Hoople (All the Young Dudes) and David Bowie (Hunky Dory and The Rise and Fall of Ziggy Stardust and the Spiders from Mars). Over this period, he produced hundreds of book covers, LP and CD covers, advertisements, portraits and drawings.

He appears in the  2012 documentary David Bowie & the Story of Ziggy Stardust (BBC Cymru Wales).

References

External links 
 

1947 births
Living people
People from Bromley
20th-century English painters
English male painters
British illustrators
Album-cover and concert-poster artists
Fantasy artists
Science fiction artists
20th-century English male artists